Amir Berkovits (born 3 June 2000) is an Israeli professional footballer who plays as a winger for Israeli Premier League club Maccabi Netanya.

Club career 
Berkovits strated his career for childern team of Hapoel Pardesiya. At summer 2016 signed for Barnsley's academy.

On 6 August 2019 signed for Maccabi Tel Aviv and loaned to Beitar Tel Aviv Bat Yam for two seasons.

On 25 May 2021 signed the Israeli Premier League club Maccabi Netanya.

Career statistics

Club

References

External links 
 

2000 births
Living people
Israeli footballers
Beitar Tel Aviv Bat Yam F.C. players
Maccabi Netanya F.C. players
Israeli Premier League players
Liga Leumit players
Footballers from Central District (Israel)
Israeli expatriate footballers
Expatriate footballers in England
Israeli expatriate sportspeople in England
Israel youth international footballers
Association football midfielders